In automotive engineering a multi-valve or multivalve engine is one where each cylinder has more than two valves. A multi-valve engine has better breathing and may be able to operate at higher revolutions per minute (RPM) than a two-valve engine, delivering more power.

Multi-valve rationale

Multi-valve engine design 

A multi-valve engine design has three, four, or five valves per cylinder to achieve improved performance.  Any four-stroke internal combustion engine needs at least two valves per cylinder: one for intake of air (and often fuel), and another for exhaust  of combustion gases.  Adding more valves increases valve area and improves the flow of intake and exhaust gases, thereby enhancing combustion, volumetric efficiency, and power output. Multi-valve geometry allows the spark plug to be ideally located within the combustion chamber for optimal flame propagation. Multi-valve engines tend to have smaller valves that have lower reciprocating mass, which can reduce wear on each cam lobe, and allow more power from higher RPM without the danger of valve bounce. Some engines are designed to open each intake valve at a slightly different time, which increases turbulence, improving the mixing of air and fuel at low engine speeds. More valves also provide additional cooling to the cylinder head. The disadvantages of multi-valve engines are an increase in manufacturing cost and a potential increase in oil consumption due to the greater number of valve stem seals. Some SOHC multi-valve engines (such as the Mazda B8-ME) use a single fork-shaped rocker arm to drive two valves (generally the exhaust valves) so that fewer cam lobes will be needed in order to reduce manufacturing costs.

 Three-valve cylinder head
This has a single large exhaust valve and two smaller intake valves.  A three-valve layout allows better breathing than a two-valve head, but the large exhaust valve results in an RPM limit no higher than a two-valve head. The manufacturing cost for this design can be lower than for a four-valve design. The three-valve design was common in the late 1980s and early 1990s; and from 2004 the main valve arrangement used in Ford F-Series trucks, and Ford SUVs. The Ducati ST3 V-twin had 3-valve heads.

 Four-valve cylinder head
This is the most common type of multi-valve head, with two exhaust valves and two similar (or slightly larger) inlet valves.  This design allows similar breathing as compared to a three-valve head, and as the small exhaust valves allow high RPM, this design is very suitable for high power outputs.

 Five-valve cylinder head
Less common is the five-valve head, with two exhaust valves and three inlet valves.  All five valves are similar in size.  This design allows excellent breathing, and, as every valve is small, high RPM and very high power outputs are theoretically available.  Although, compared to a four-valve engine, a five-valve design should have a higher maximum RPM, and the three inlet ports should give efficient cylinder-filling and high gas turbulence (both desirable traits), it has been questioned whether a five-valve configuration gives a cost-effective benefit over four-valve designs. The rise of direct injection may also make five-valve heads more difficult to engineer, as the injector must take up some space on the head. After making five-valve Genesis engines for several years, Yamaha has since reverted back to the cheaper four-valve design.

Examples of the five-valve engines are the various 1.8 L 20vT engines manufactured by AUDI AG, the later versions of the Ferrari Dino V8, and the 1.6 L 20-valve 4A-GE engine made by Toyota in collaboration with Yamaha. 

 Beyond five valves
For a cylindrical bore and equal-area sized valves, increasing the number of valves beyond five decreases the total valve area. The following table shows the effective areas of differing valve quantities as proportion of cylinder bore.  These percentages are based on simple geometry and do not take into account orifices for spark plugs or injectors, but these voids will usually be sited in the "dead space" unavailable for valves.  Also, in practice, intake valves are often larger than exhaust valves in heads with an even number of valves-per-cylinder:
 2 = 50%
 3 = 64%
 4 = 68%
 5 = 68%
 6 = 66%
 7 = 64%
 8 = 61%

Alternative technologies 

Turbocharging and supercharging are technologies that also improve engine breathing, and can be used instead of, or in conjunction with, multi-valve engines. The same applies to variable valve timing and variable-length intake manifolds. Rotary valves also offer improved engine breathing and high rev performance but these were never very successful. Cylinder head porting, as part of engine tuning, is also used to improve engine performance.

Cars and trucks

Before 1914 
The 1908 Ariès VT race cars had 1.4 litre supercharged single cylinder engines with four valve per cylinder desmodromic systems. (Source: [1])

The 1910 Isotta-Fraschini Tipo KM had a 10.6 litre inline 4 with single overhead camshaft and four valves per cylinder and it had one of the first engines with fully enclosed overhead valve gear (source: Isotta Fraschini Tipo KM  and )

The first motorcar in the world to have an engine with two overhead camshafts and four valves per cylinder was the 1912 Peugeot L76 Grand Prix race car designed by Ernest Henry. Its 7.6-litre monobloc straight-4 with modern hemispherical combustion chambers produced  (19.5 HP/Liter(0.32 bhp per cubic inch)). In April 1913, on the Brooklands racetrack in England, a specially built L76 called "la Torpille" (torpedo) beat the world speed record of 170 km/h. Robert Peugeot also commissioned the young Ettore Bugatti to develop a GP racing car for the 1912 Grand Prix. This chain-driven Bugatti Type 18 had a 5-litre straight-4 with SOHC and three valves per cylinder (two inlet, one exhaust). It produced appr.  at 2800 rpm (0.30 bhp per cubic inch) and could reach . The three-valve head would later be used for some of Bugatti's most famous cars, including the 1922 Type 29 Grand Prix racer and the legendary Type 35 of 1924.

Between 1914 and 1945 

A.L.F.A. 40/60 GP was a fully working early racing car prototype made by the company now called Alfa Romeo. Only one example was built in 1914, which was later modified in 1921. This design of Giuseppe Merosi was the first Alfa Romeo DOHC engine. It had four valves per cylinder, 90-degree valve angle and twin-spark ignition. The GP engine had a displacement of 4.5-liter (4490 cc) and produced  at 2950 rpm (14.7 kW/liter), and after modifications in 1921  at 3000 rpm. The top speed of this car was 88-93 mph (140–149 km/h). It wasn't until the 1920s when these DOHC engines came to Alfa road cars like the Alfa Romeo 6C.

In 1916 US automotive magazine Automobile Topics described a four-cylinder, four-valve-per-cylinder car engine made by Linthwaite-Hussey Motor Co. of Los Angeles, CA, USA: "Firm offers two models of high-speed motor with twin intakes and exhausts.".

Early multi-valve engines in T-head configuration were the 1917 Stutz straight-4, White Motor Car Model GL 327 CID Dual Valve Mononblock four, and 1919 Pierce-Arrow straight-6 engines. The standard flathead engines of that day were not very efficient and designers tried to improve engine performance by using multiple valves. The Stutz Motor Company used a modified T-head with 16 valves, twin-spark ignition and aluminium pistons to produce 80 bhp (59 kW) at 2400 rpm from a 360.8 cid (5.8-liter) straight-4 (0.22 bhp per cubic inch). Over 2300 of these powerful early multi-valve engines were built. Stutz not only used them in their famous Bearcat sportscar but in their standard touring cars as well. The mono block White Motor Car engine developed 72 horsepower and less than 150 were built, only three are known to exist today. In 1919 Pierce-Arrow introduced its 524.8 cid (8.6-liter) straight-6 with 24 valves. The engine produced 48.6 bhp (0.09 bhp per cubic inch) and ran very quietly, which was an asset to the bootleggers of that era.

Multi-valve engines continued to be popular in racing and sports engines. Robert M. Roof, the chief engineer for Laurel Motors, designed his multi-valve Roof Racing Overheads early in the 20th century. Type A 16-valve heads were successful in the teens, Type B was offered in 1918 and Type C 16-valve in 1923. Frank Lockhart drove a Type C overhead cam car to victory in Indiana in 1926.

Bugatti also had developed a 1.5-liter OHV straight-4 with four valves per cylinder as far back as 1914 but did not use this engine until after World War I. It produced appr. 30 bhp (22.4 kW) at 2700 rpm (15.4 kW/liter or 0.34 bhp/cid). In the 1920 Voiturettes Grand Prix at Le Mans driver Ernest Friderich finished first in a Bugatti Type 13 with the 16-valve engine, averaging 91.96 km/h. Even more successful was Bugattis clean sweep of the first four places at Brescia in 1921. In honour of this memorable victory all 16-valve-engined Bugattis were dubbed Brescia. From 1920 through 1926 about 2000 were built.

Peugeot had a triple overhead cam 5-valve Grand Prix car in 1921.

Bentley used multi-valve engines from the beginning. The Bentley 3 Litre, introduced in 1921, used a monobloc straight-4 with aluminium pistons, pent-roof combustion chambers, twin spark ignition, SOHC, and four valves per cylinder. It produced appr. 70 bhp (0.38 bhp per cubic inch). The 1927 Bentley 4½ Litre was of similar engine design. The NA racing model offered 130 bhp (0.48 bhp per cubic inch) and the 1929 supercharged 4½ Litre (Blower Bentley) reached 240 bhp (0.89 bhp per cubic inch). The 1926 Bentley 6½ Litre added two cylinders to the monobloc straight-4. This multi-valve straight-6 offered 180-200 bhp (0.45-0.50 bhp per cubic inch). The 1930 Bentley 8 Litre multi-valve straight-6 produced appr. 220 bhp (0.45 bhp per cubic inch).

In 1931 the Stutz Motor Company introduced a 322 cid (5.3-liter) dual camshaft 32-valve straight-8 with 156 bhp (116 kW) at 3900 rpm, called DV-32. The engine offered 0.48 bhp per cubic inch. About 100 of these multi-valve engines were built. Stutz also used them in their top-of-the-line sportscar, the DV-32 Super Bearcat that could reach 100 mph (160 km/h).

The 1935 Duesenberg SJ Mormon Meteor's engine was a 419.6 cid (6.9-liter) straight-8 with DOHC, 4 valves per cylinder and a supercharger. It achieved 400 bhp (298.3 kW) at 5,000 rpm and 0.95 bhp per cubic inch.

The 1937 Mercedes-Benz W125 racing car used a supercharged 5.7-liter straight-8 with DOHC and four valves per cylinder. The engine produced 592-646 bhp (441.5-475 kW) at 5800 rpm and achieved  1.71-1.87 bhp per cubic inch (77.8-85.1 kW/liter). The W125 top speed was appr. 200 mph (322 km/h).

After 1945 

The 1967 Cosworth DFV F1 engine, a NA 3.0-liter V8 producing appr.  at 9,000 rpm (101.9 kW/liter), featured four valves per cylinder. For many years it was the dominant engine in Formula One, and it was also used in other categories, including CART, Formula 3000 and Sportscar racing.

Debuting at the 1968 Japanese Grand Prix in the original  3.0-liter version the Toyota 7 engine participated in endurance races as a 5.0-liter (4,968 cc) non-turbo V8 with DOHC and 32-valves.

There is much discussion about which was the first 'mass-produced' car to use an engine with four valves per cylinder.  For six cylinder engines, and considering special versions of mass-produced cars, the first appears to have been the 1969 Nissan Skyline, using the Nissan S20 six cylinder DOHC four-valve engine.  This engine was also fitted to Nissan Fairlady Z432 racing edition.  

For a four cylinder engine, the first mass-produced car using a four valves per cylinder engine was the British Ford Escort RS1600, this car used the Cosworth BDA engine which was a Ford 'Kent' block with a Cosworth 16 valve twin cam cylinder head. The car went on to become a rallying legend in the 1970s winning many domestic and World Championship events. Other cars claiming to be first are the Jensen Healey, launched in 1972 which used a Lotus 907 belt-driven DOHC 16-valve 2-liter straight-4 producing 140 bhp (54.6 kW/liter, 1.20 bhp/cid). All of these, although mass-produced, are also of relatively limited production, so it is argued that the first widely available and popularly priced mass-production car with a four valve per cylinder engine was the 1973 Triumph Dolomite Sprint.  This Triumph used an in-house developed SOHC 16-valve 1,998 cc (122 ci) straight-4 engine that produced 127 bhp (47.6 kW/liter, 1.10 bhp/cid) at introduction. 

The 1975 Chevrolet Cosworth Vega featured a DOHC multi-valve head designed by Cosworth Engineering in the UK.

The 1976 Fiat 131 Abarth (51.6 kW/liter), 1976 Lotus Esprit with Lotus 907 engine (54.6 kW/liter, 1.20 bhp/cid), and 1978 BMW M1 with BMW M88 engine (58.7 kW/liter, 1.29 bhp/cid) all used four valves per cylinder. The BMW M88/3 engine was used in the 1983 BMW M635CSi and in the 1985 BMW M5.

The 1978 Porsche 935/78 racer used a twin turbo 3.2-liter flat-6 (845 bhp/630 kW@8,200 rpm; 784 Nm/578 ft.lbs@6,600 rpm). The water-cooled engine featured four valves per cylinder and output a massive 196.2 kW/liter. Porsche had to abandon its traditional aircooling because the multi-valve DOHC hampered aircooling of the spark plugs. Only two cars were built.

Ferrari developed their Quattrovalvole (or QV) engines in the 80s. A very unusual Dino Quattrovalvole was used in the 1986 Lancia Thema 8.32. It was based on the 308 QV's engine, but used a split-plane crankshaft rather than the Ferrari-type flat-plane. The engine was constructed by Ducati rather than Ferrari, and was produced from 1986 through 1991. The Quattrovalvole was also used by Lancia for their attempt at the World Sportscar Championship with the LC2. The engine was twin-turbocharged and destroked to 2.65 litres, but produced  in qualifying trim. The 1984 Ferrari Testarossa had a 4.9-liter flat-12 with four valves per cylinder. Almost 7,200 Testarossa were produced between 1984 and 1991.

In 1985 Lamborghini released a Countach Quattrovalvole, producing   from a 5.2-liter (5167 cc) Lamborghini V12 engine (64.8 kW/liter).

The engine was based on the 2.3-liter 8-valve 136 hp (101 kW) unit already fitted to the 190- and E-Class series. Cosworth developed the DOHC light alloy cast cylinder head with four large valves per cylinder. In 1988 an enlarged 2.5-liter engine replaced the 2.3-liter. It offered double valve timing chains to fix the easily snapping single chains on early 2.3 engines, and increased peak output by 17 bhp (12.5 kW) with a slight increase in torque. For homologation Evolution I (1989) and Evolution II (1990) models were produced that had a redesigned engine to allow for a higher rev limit and improved top-end power capabilities. The Evo II engine offered   from 2463 cc (70.2 kW/liter).

Saab introduced a 16-valve head to their 2.0-liter (1985 cc) straight-4 in 1984 and offered the engine with and without turbocharger (65.5 kW/liter and 47.9 kW/liter respectively) in the Saab 900 and Saab 9000.

The 2.0-liter Nissan FJ20 was one of the earliest straight-4 mass-produced Japanese engines to have both a DOHC 16-valve configuration (four valves per cylinder, two intake, two exhaust) and electronic fuel injection (EFI) when released in October 1981 in the sixth generation Nissan Skyline.

Following Nissan's lead, Toyota released the 1.6-liter (1,587 cc) 4A-GE engine in 1983. The cylinder head was developed by Yamaha Motor Corporation and was built at Toyota's Shimayama plant. While originally conceived of as a two-valve design, Toyota and Yamaha changed the 4A-GE to a four-valve after a year of evaluation. To compensate for the reduced air speed of a multi-valve engine at low rpms, the first-to-second generation engines included the T-VIS intake system.

In 1986 Volkswagen introduced a multi-valved Golf GTI 16V. The 16-valve 1.8-liter straight-4 produced 139 PS (102 kW; 137 bhp) or 56.7 kW/liter, almost 25% up from the 45.6 kW/liter for the previous 8-valve Golf GTI engine.

The GM Quad 4 multi-valve engine family debuted early 1987. The Quad 4 was the first mainstream multi-valve engine to be produced by GM after the Chevrolet Cosworth Vega. Such engines soon became common as Japanese manufacturers adopted the multi-valve concept.

Three valves 

The 1975 Honda Civic introduced Honda's 1.5-liter SOHC 12-valve straight-4 engines. Nissan's 1988–1992 SOHC KA24E engine had three valves per cylinder (two intakes, one exhaust) as well. Nissan upgraded to DOHC after 1992 for some of their sports cars, including the 240SX.

In 1988, Renault released a 12 valve version of its Douvrin 4 cylinder 2.0l SOHC.

Mercedes and Ford produced three-valve V6 and V8 engines, Ford claiming an 80% improvement in high RPM breathing without the added cost of a DOHC valve train. The Ford design uses one spark plug per cylinder located in the centre, but the Mercedes design uses two spark plugs per cylinder located on opposite sides, leaving the centre free to add a direct-to-cylinder fuel injector at a later date.

The 1989 Citroën XM was the first 3-valve diesel-engined car.

Four valves 

Examples of SOHC four-valve engines include the Honda F-series engines, D-series engines, all J-series engines, the R-series engines, the Mazda B8-ME, and the Chrysler 3.5 L V6 engine.

The V12 engines of many World War II fighter aircraft also used a SOHC configuration with four valves for each cylinder.

The 1993 Mercedes-Benz C-Class (OM604 engine) was the first 4-valve diesel-engined car.

Five valves 

Peugeot had a triple overhead cam five-valve Grand Prix car in 1921.

In April 1988 an Audi 200 Turbo Quattro powered by an experimental 2.2-liter turbocharged 25-valve straight-5 rated at 478 kW/650 PS@6,200 rpm (217.3 kW/liter) set two world speed records at Nardo, Italy: 326.403 km/h (202.8 mph) for 1,000 km (625 miles) and 324.509 km/h (201.6 mph) for 500 miles.

Mitsubishi were the first to market a car engine with five valves per cylinder, with the 548 cc 3G81 engine in their Minica Dangan ZZ kei car in 1989.

Yamaha designed the five-valve cylinder head for the 20-valve 4A-GE engines made by Toyota for use in some Toyota Corolla models in Japan. Yamaha also developed five-valve Formula One engines, the 1989 OX88 V8, 1991 OX99 V12, 1993 OX10 V10 and 1996 OX11 V10, but none of these were very successful.
For their YZ250F and YZ450F motocross bikes, Yamaha developed five-valve engines.

Bugatti (EB 110), Ferrari (F355, 360 and F50), Volkswagen - Audi (Audi Quattro) - Skoda (Octavia vRS) and Toyota (4A-GE 20V) have all produced five-valve-engined vehicles.

Six valves 

In 1985, Maserati made an experimental 2.0-liter turbo V6 engine with six valves per cylinder (three intakes, three exhaust). It achieved  at 7,200 rpm (97.5 kW/liter).

Pushrod 

Although most multi-valve engines have overhead camshafts, either SOHC or DOHC, a multivalve engine may be a pushrod overhead valve engine (OHV) design. GM has revealed a three-valve version of its Generation IV V8 which uses pushrods to actuate forked rockers, and  all Duramax V8 engines have four valves per cylinder with pushrods. Moreover, Cummins makes a four-valve OHV straight six diesel, the Cummins B Series (now known as ISB). Ford also uses pushrods in its 6.7L Power Stroke 
engine using four pushrods, four rockers and four valves per cylinder. The 6.0 and 6.4 Powerstroke engine built by Navistar also used pushrods with four-valve heads. Pushrod multi-valve systems are common on diesels because they need to be able to meet emissions standards, but also produce more low-end torque. The Harley-Davidson Milwaukee Eight engine, introduced in 2016, uses four-valves per cylinder driven by pushrods and a single in-block camshaft.

Turbocharged 

The 1980 Lotus Essex Turbo Esprit (with type 910 2.2-liter inline four engine) was the first production car to use a multi-valve turbocharged engine.

Motorcycles 

Examples of motorcycles with multivalve-engines include:
 1914 Peugeot Grand Prix racer, 500 cc DOHC 8-valve parallel twin (top speed over 122 km/h).
 1915 Indian board track racer, 61-cid (1.0-liter) OHV 8-valve V-twin.
 1921 Triumph Ricardo 499 cc OHV 4-valve single-cylinder machine, copied by Rudge-Whitworth with their 1924 Rudge Four 350 cc OHV 4-valve single-cylinder machine, and 1929 Rudge Ulster 500 cc OHV 4-valve single-cylinder machine.
 1923 British Anzani 1098cc OHV 8-Valve V-twin, used in Morgan three-wheelers and McEvoy motorcycles
 1972 Honda XL250 "pent-roof" SOHC 4-valve single-cylinder machine (the first mass-produced 4-valve motorcycle).
 1973 Yamaha TX500 "pent-roof" 500cc DOHC 8-valve parallel-twin (the first mass-produced DOHC 4-valve per cylinder motorcycle)
 1977 Honda CB400 SOHC 6-valve parallel-twin.
 1978 Honda CX500, a 498 cc SOHC, pushrod actuated OHV, 4-valve per cylinder V-twin; 1982 CX500 Turbo was the first factory multi-valve turbocharged motorcycle.
 1978 Honda CBX1000, a 1,047 cc DOHC 24-valve straight-6.
 1979 -1992: Honda NR series, racing & production motorcycles with 8-valve-per-cylinder "oval-piston" V4 engines (actually 32-valve V8s with adjoining cylinders merged).
 1985 Yamaha FZ750 motorcycle with DOHC 20-valve straight-4 Yamaha "Genesis" engine.
 1991-2010 Yamaha TDM and TRX parallel twin motorcycles with 5 valves per cylinder
 1998–2006 Yamaha YZF-R1 superbike with redesigned (more compact) "Genesis" engine. 2006 model delivered  at 12,500 rpm (130.3 kW/liter).

The Yamaha XT660 single once had five valves per cylinder, but a subsequent redesign reduced the valve-count to four. The Aprilia Pegaso 650 single also started out with five valves, but current models only have four. The jointly developed BMW F650 single always had four valves.

Aircraft 

Ettore Bugatti designed several multi-valve aircraft engines. The 1916 Bugatti U-16 1484.3 cid (24.32 L) SOHC 16-cylinder, consisting of two parallel 8-cylinder banks, offered 410 bhp (305 kW) at 2,000 rpm (12.5 kW/liter or 0.28 bhp/cid). Each cylinder had two vertical inlet valves and a single vertical exhaust valve, all driven by rocking levers from the camshaft. Other advanced World War I aircraft engines, such as the 1916 Maybach Mb.IVa that produced  at altitude and the 1916 Benz Bz.IV with aluminium pistons and the 1918 Napier Lion (a 450 bhp 24-liter DOHC 12-cylinder), used two intake valves and two exhaust valves.

Long after the King-Bugatti "U-16" aviation engine used them, shortly before World War II, the Junkers aviation firm began production of the Third Reich's most-produced military aviation engine (68,000+ produced), the 1936-designed, 35-litre displacement, inverted-V12, liquid-cooled Junkers Jumo 211, which used a three-valve cylinder head design inherited from Junkers' first inverted V12 design, the 1932-origin Junkers Jumo 210 — this was carried through into the later, more powerful 1940-origin Junkers Jumo 213, produced through 1945, the production versions of which (the Jumo 213A and -E subtypes) retained the Jumo 211's three-valve cylinder head design.

The V12 engines of many World War II fighter aircraft used a SOHC configuration with four valves for each cylinder.

An example of a modern multi-valve piston-engine for small aircraft is the Austro Engine AE300. This liquid-cooled turbocharged 2.0-liter (1,991 cc) DOHC 16-valve straight-4 diesel engine uses common rail direct fuel injection and delivers  at 3,880 rpm (62.0 kW/liter). The propeller is driven by an integrated gearbox (ratio 1.69:1) with torsional vibration damper.

Boats 
In 1905 car builder Delahaye had experimented with a DOHC marine racing engine with six valves per cylinder. This Delahaye Titan engine was a massive 5190 cid (85.0-liter) four-cylinder that produced 350 bhp (0.07 bhp/cid). It allowed the motor boat Le Dubonnet piloted by Emile Dubonnet to set a new world's speed record on water, reaching  on the lake at Juvisy, near Paris, France.

An example of modern multi-valve engines for small boats is the Volvo Penta IPS Series. These joystick-operated seawater-cooled inboard diesel engines use combined charging (turbo and supercharger, except IPS450) with aftercooler, common rail fuel injection and DOHCs with hydraulic 4-valve technology. Multiple units can be combined.

References

External links 
 Kinematic Models for Design Digital Library (KMODDL) - Movies and photos of hundreds of working mechanical-systems models at Cornell University. Also includes an e-book library of classic texts on mechanical design and engineering.

Engine technology
Engine valves